Macau competed at the 1992 Summer Paralympics in Barcelona, Spain. 2 competitors from Macau won no medals and so did not place in the medal table.

See also 
 Macau at the Paralympics

References 

Macau at the Paralympics
1992 in Macau sport
Nations at the 1992 Summer Paralympics